William Alne was an English merchant who was a Member of Parliament for City of York in May 1413 and March 1416. He was also bailiff, chamberlain, councillor, and sheriff of his native York, the first two positions also held by his father Richard Alne (died 1409).

References

English MPs May 1413
English MPs March 1416
Bailiffs
Chamberlains
Councillors in North Yorkshire
Politicians from York
Sheriffs in the United Kingdom
15th-century English politicians